Diego Borrego (born 29 January 1972) is a Spanish golfer.

He started playing golf at the age of seven and turned professional in 1991. He was a rookie on the European Tour in 1994, and two years later, he had his best season, winning the Turespana Masters and finishing thirtieth on the European Tour Order of Merit. He won his second European Tour title at the 2002 Madeira Island Open, but he has sometimes struggled to hold on to his card, and in 2006 dropped down to the second tier Challenge Tour.

Amateur wins
1990 Spanish Amateur Open Championship
1991 Italian Amateur Open Championship, Spanish Amateur Closed Championship

Professional wins (7)

European Tour wins (2)

1Dual-ranking event with the Challenge Tour

European Tour playoff record (1–0)

Challenge Tour wins (3)

1Dual-ranking event with the European Tour

Other wins (3)
1998 Azores Open (Portugal)
1999 Campeonato de Catalunya, Oki Telepizza - Salamanca (both Spain)

Team appearances
Amateur
Jacques Léglise Trophy (representing the Continent of Europe): 1988, 1989
Eisenhower Trophy (representing Spain): 1990
European Boys' Team Championship (representing Spain): 1990 (winners)
European Amateur Team Championship (representing Spain): 1991

Professional
Dunhill Cup (representing Spain): 1996
World Cup (representing Spain): 1996

References

External links

Spanish male golfers
European Tour golfers
Mediterranean Games medalists in golf
Mediterranean Games bronze medalists for Spain
Competitors at the 1991 Mediterranean Games
Sportspeople from Málaga
1972 births
Living people
20th-century Spanish people
21st-century Spanish people